A debug symbol is a special kind of symbol that attaches additional information to the symbol table of an object file, such as a shared library or an executable. This information allows a symbolic debugger to gain access to information from the source code of the binary, such as the names of identifiers, including variables and routines. 

The symbolic information may be compiled together with the module's binary file, or distributed in a separate file, or simply discarded during the compilation and/or linking. 

This information can be helpful while trying to investigate and fix a crashing application or any other fault.

Embedded symbols
Debug symbols typically include not only the name of a function or global variable, but also the name of the source code file in which the symbol occurs, as well as the line number at which it is defined. Other information includes the type of the symbol (integer, float, function, exception, etc.), the scope (block scope or global scope), the size, and, for classes, the name of the class, and the methods and members in it. All of this additional information can take up quite a bit of space, especially the filenames and line numbers. Thus, binaries with debug symbols can become quite large, often several times the stripped file size. To avoid this extra size, most operating system distributions ship binaries that are stripped, i.e. from which all of the debugging symbols have been removed. This is accomplished, for example, with the strip command in Unix.

Some compilers will output the symbolic debugging information into a separate file, rather than placing it together with the binary.

SysV ABI
The SysV Application Binary Interface includes a specification for the format of debug symbols. This allows any compatible compiler or assembler to create debug symbols in a standardized format, and for any debugger, such as GDB, to gain access and display these symbols. For example, part of the important debug information includes the line of code in the source file which defines that symbol (a function or global variable), as well as symbols associated with exception frames.

Microsoft debug symbols
Microsoft compilers generate a file called a PDB file containing debug symbols. Some companies ship the PDB on their CD/DVD to enable troubleshooting and other companies (like Microsoft, and the Mozilla Corporation) allow downloading debug symbols from the Internet. The WinDBG debugger and the Visual Studio IDE can be configured to automatically download debug symbols for Windows DLLs on demand. The PDB debug symbols that Microsoft distributes include only public functions, global variables and their data types. The Mozilla Corporation has similar infrastructure but distributes full debug information.

Both Microsoft and Mozilla also offer the source code (Microsoft provides certain components, such as most of the .NET Framework, whereas Mozilla offers full source) to make debugging easier.

Apple
On Apple platforms, debug symbols are optionally emitted during the build process as dSYM file(s). Apple uses the term "symbolicate" to refer to the replacement of addresses in diagnostic files with human readable values.

History
Symbolic debuggers have existed since the mainframe era, almost since the first introduction of suitable computer displays on which to display the symbolic debugging information (and even earlier with symbolic dumps on paper). They were not restricted to high level compiled languages and were available also for Assembly language programs. For the IBM/360, these produced object code (on request) that included "SYM cards". These were usually ignored by the program loader but were useful to a symbolic debugger as they were kept on the same program library as the executable logic code.

See also
 CA/EZTEST
 Debugging data format
 Microsoft SYMDEB

References

Public symbol and source servers
 Microsoft Symbol Server
 Microsoft Reference Source Server: http://referencesource.microsoft.com/
 Mozilla Source Server: https://firefox-source-docs.mozilla.org/taskcluster/using-the-mozilla-source-server.html
 .NET libraries at SymbolSource: http://www.symbolsource.org/

Debugging